The Great Stone War is the second studio album by American deathcore band Winds of Plague. It was released on August 11, 2009 through Century Media Records. The album also marks the recording debut of drummer Art Cruz and keyboardist Kristen Randall. The Great Stone War sold 6,300 copies in its first week of release to debut at No. 73 on The Billboard 200 chart. A cover of "Halloween" by Misfits appears as a bonus track on iTunes.

Composition 
Winds of Plague described the record as a concept album. Vocalist Johnny Plague states, "The idea of The Great Stone War is that civilization as a whole will digress and in time inevitably end with one final battle. This battle will not be fought with technology but with stone. Over the course of eleven tracks the listener hears about a journey foreseen through the eyes of a heathen in a religious world apocalypse. Even in the world's darkest times you always have to take a step back and see life for what it is and not lose sight of what is most important."

Track listing

Personnel

Winds of Plague
 Jonathan "Johnny Plague" Cooke-Hayden – unclean vocals
 Nick Eash – lead guitar
 Nick Piunno – rhythm guitar
 Andrew Glover – bass, engineering assistance
 Art Cruz – drums, percussion
 Kristen Randall – keyboards, clean vocals

Additional musicians
 Martin Stewart of Terror – guest vocals on tracks 2, 13
 John Mishima – guest vocals on track 6
 Mitch Lucker of Suicide Silence – guest vocals on track 9

Additional personnel
 Daniel Castleman – production, engineering
 Tue Madsen – mixing, mastering
 Brian Lawlor and Ryan Kelly – orchestral arrangements
 Ash Avildsen – booking
 Steve Joh – A&R
 Pär Olofsson – artwork
 Rob Kimura – layout, design

References

2009 albums
Winds of Plague albums
Century Media Records albums
Concept albums
Albums with cover art by Pär Olofsson